Gaoping (高平市) is a county-level city in Shanxi, China.  

Gaoping may also refer to:

 Gaoping District, a district of Nanchong, Sichuan

Towns and townships
China
 Gaoping, Guizhou, a town in Zunyi, Guizhou
 Gaoping, Liuyang (高坪镇), a township in Liuyang, Hunan
 Gaoping, Longhui (高平镇), a town in Longhui County, Hunan
 Gaoping, Yongshun (高坪乡), a township in Yongshun County, Hunan

Vietnam
 Cao Bang in historical Jiaozhi, today in Vietnam

Other uses

 Gaoping River, a major river in southern Taiwan
 Gaoping railway station, in Jianshi County, Hubei
 Nanchong Gaoping Airport, an airport in Nanchong, Sichuan